The Union Dissolution Day, observed in Norway on 7 June (though not a public holiday), is marked in remembrance of the Norwegian parliament's 1905 declaration of dissolution of the union with Sweden, a personal union which had existed since 1814.  The day is celebrated in Norway as the Independence Day and is an official flag flying day, and is observed with ordinary salute at Akershus Fortress. The Independence Day, however, has few traditions of celebration beyond that.

Royal return after World War II  
By historical coincidence, 7 June was also the date in 1940 when King Haakon VII of Norway and the royal family, along with the Norwegian cabinet and parliament, had to leave the country after escaping the German forces during the World War II invasion of Norway; and it is also the date in 1945 on which the King returned after 5 years of exile in London.

Gallery

References

External links 
 Norway 1905–2005 – Newspaper Aftenposten 's Union Dissolution Centennial feature
 Withdrawal from the union The Royal Court of Norway 
 7. juni-beslutningen www.norgeshistorie.no University of Oslo 
 Homecoming, 7 June 1945  The Royal Court of Norway by the 75th anniversary in 2020 
 Norwegians recall the 7th of June 

Public holidays in Norway
June observances
1905 establishments in Norway
Norwegian flag flying days